Diego Gregori (born 26 July 1995) is a Spanish professional footballer who plays as a midfielder for CF Villanovense. Besides Spain, he has played in Colombia and El Salvador.

Career
Gregori started his senior career with CF Torre Levante. In 2015, he signed for Envigado in the Colombian Categoría Primera A, where he made 46 appearances and scored three goals. After that, he played for UD Ibiza, Jumilla, and CF Villanovense. In 2021, he signed for Isidro Metapán.

References

External links 
 Playing in the country where "people kill for their team" 
 Grégori and García, the Spaniards from Envigado who feel like paisa 
 Diego Gregori: "We must fight to re-enter at 8"
 Diego Gregori and M. Cosme, from Torre Levante to América de Cali

Living people
1995 births
Sportspeople from Valencia
Spanish footballers
Association football midfielders
Categoría Primera A players
Segunda División B players
Salvadoran Primera División players
Envigado F.C. players
América de Cali footballers
CF Torre Levante players
UD Ibiza players
FC Jumilla players
CF Villanovense players
CD Manchego Ciudad Real players
A.D. Isidro Metapán footballers
Spanish expatriate footballers
Spanish expatriate sportspeople in Colombia
Expatriate footballers in Colombia
Spanish expatriate sportspeople in El Salvador
Expatriate footballers in El Salvador